DWIP (94.5 FM), broadcasting as 94.5 Love Radio, is Philippines a radio station owned and operated by Manila Broadcasting Company. The station's studio and transmitter are located at the 4/F Dermaplaza Bldg., Villasis Highway, Santiago City, Isabela Province.

History
It was inaugurated on December 19, 1981, on 97.9 FM with an easy listening format as "Beautiful Music Radio". Its transmitter was 1 kW. In 1995, the station transferred its frequency to 94.5 FM and was rebranded as Love Radio with a mass-based format and upgraded its transmitting power to 5 kW.

References

Radio stations established in 1981
Love Radio Network stations
Radio stations in Isabela (province)